The 1990–91 Toronto Maple Leafs season was the 74th season of the Toronto NHL franchise. The Leafs finished fifth and last in the Norris Division and did not qualify for the playoffs.

Offseason

NHL draft

Regular season
 Dave Reid had a career high 15 goals. He led the league with 8 shorthanded goals. In November, Reid had five shorthanded goals over four games.
 Allan Bester was traded by Maple Leafs to Detroit Red Wings for sixth-round choice (Alexander Kuzminsky) in 1991 entry draft, March 5, 1991.

Season standings

Schedule and results

Player statistics

Regular season
Scoring

Goaltending

Transactions
The Maple Leafs were involved in the following transactions during the 1990-91 season.

Trades

Waivers

Free agents

Awards and records
 Peter Ing, Molson Cup (Most game star selections for Toronto Maple Leafs)
 Dave Reid, NHL leader, 8 shorthanded goals

Milestones

Farm team
 The Toronto Maple Leafs farm team was the Newmarket Saints and they were affiliated in the American Hockey League. The Saints had 26 wins, 45 losses and 9 ties. They finished 8th in the South Division and failed to qualify for the playoffs. It would be the Saints final year in Newmarket, Ontario. The franchise relocated to St. John's, Newfoundland.

References
 Maple Leafs on Hockey Database
 Game log at Database Hockey

Toronto Maple Leafs seasons
Toronto Maple Leafs season, 1990-91
Toronto